David Bryan Poythress (October 24, 1943 – January 15, 2017) was an American politician, born in Bibb County, Georgia. He served terms as Secretary of State and Commissioner of Labor of the state of Georgia. Poythress also served as the Adjutant General of the Georgia National Guard from 1999 until 2007, initially appointed by Governor Roy Barnes and subsequently reappointed by Governor Sonny Perdue. He retired as a lieutenant general.

In 1998, Poythress made an unsuccessful bid for Governor of Georgia. On August 26, 2008, Poythress announced his intention to run again as a Democratic candidate for governor in the 2010 election. In both 1998 and 2010, Poythress lost to Roy Barnes.

Poythress and his wife Elizabeth had three grown children and eight grandchildren. He was a member of the Sigma Chi fraternity. Poythress died on January 15, 2017, at the age of 73. He was interred at Riverside Cemetery in Macon, Georgia.

Education
1964: Bachelor of arts degree in political science, Emory University, Atlanta, Ga.
1967: Juris doctor degree (with honors), Emory University School of Law, Atlanta, Ga.
1986: Air War College, by correspondence

References

External links

Poythress for Governor Web Site
Georgia Department of Defense Bio
National Guard Bureau Bio

1943 births
2017 deaths
People from Bibb County, Georgia
Emory University alumni
Emory University School of Law alumni
Air War College alumni
Recipients of the Meritorious Service Medal (United States)
National Guard (United States) generals
Recipients of the Legion of Merit
United States Air Force generals
Georgia (U.S. state) Democrats
Secretaries of State of Georgia (U.S. state)